The Corner Market, or Corner Market Building, is a building at Seattle's Pike Place Market, in the U.S. state of Washington.

History 
The building was completed in 1912. Businesses which have operated in the Corner Market include The Crumpet Shop, Frank's Quality Produce, Left Bank Books, Matt's in the Market, Oriental Mart, and Storyville Coffee.

References

External links

 

1912 establishments in Washington (state)
Buildings and structures completed in 1912
Buildings and structures in Seattle
Central Waterfront, Seattle
Pike Place Market